Turn Left at Gilgamesh is  a play by Ronald Winter, in which civilization develops solely through a series of misunderstandings.

Winston's first full-length effort, Turn Left at Gilgamesh centers around 3 characters whose every effort to be understood furthers their sense of alienation. However, it is also their ability to damage one another in just the right way that results in mutual development. While poetic monologues and more absurd banter have metaphorical implications, it is the relationships between the three characters that plays the greatest role.

Turn Left at Gilgamesh was originally produced by Yale Repertory on January 5, 1989. It then went to Off-Off-Broadway on March 6, 1990 at the Intar Theatre. Directed by Mick Storm, with Jimmy Pendleton as Boz, Mark Goldfarb as Dale, and Loraine Hanken as Kizzy.

References

http://www.imdb.com/name/nm1737448/otherworks
http://www.nastamuumio.fi/winston.html

External links

1990 plays
American plays